Lysurus cruciatus or the lizard's-claw stinkhorn is a species of fungus in the stinkhorn family. It was first described scientifically in 1845 by French botanists François Mathias René Leprieur and Camille Montagne as Aserophallus cruciatus. German mycologist Paul Christoph Hennings transferred it to the genus Lysurus in 1902. Its fruit bodies feature a white, cylindrical tube supporting a cluster of hollow, reddish pointed arms whose surface is covered with foul-smelling spore mass, or gleba. The gleba is brownish to greenish in color, and contains spores with dimensions of 3–4 by 1.5–2 µm.

In 1901, this mushroom was rediscovered in Inanda, Natal. This "new" find was named L. Woodii, which was later corrected to be the previously discovered L. Cruciatus.

References

External links

Phallales
Fungi described in 1845
Fungi of North America